The Blue Smoke World Tour is the eleventh concert tour by American recording artist Dolly Parton. The tour promotes Parton's 42nd studio album, Blue Smoke. Beginning in January 2014, the tour played forty-seven shows in North America, Oceania, and Europe. On Pollstar's Mid Year Top 100 Worldwide Tours list, released in July 2014 and ranking tours up until that date, the Blue Smoke World Tour ranked at number 23 with $23.3 million in grosses and 210,288 tickets sold for 38 shows.

Background
Parton mentioned working on a new album in July 2013. A month later, news of a tour hit multiple media outlets, as the singer was promoting the expansion of her theme park, Dollywood. The tour was officially announced on The Queen Latifah Show in October 21, 2013. She also performed a new song, "Miss You, Miss Me" along with performing a "rap" that went viral. Parton initially revealed dates only in Australia. Along with the announcement, the singer posted a message to her Australian fans on her official website. It stated: "Australia, here I come again. We have a lot of new and exciting things for the show and can’t wait to share it with you. I love my fans in that part of the world. You've been so very good to me for so many years and I know that we're gonna have a wonderful time. It's a long way from home in your part of the world, but I always feel like I'm right at home. So Australia, I'm coming home. Wait up!"

The tour will serve as the main promotional vehicle behind her forthcoming album, Blue Smoke. Shortly after the announcement, additional shows were revealed in Europe, specifically the United Kingdom, Ireland, Scandinavia and Germany. With the release of European shows, Parton remarked: "Every time I come to Europe, I'm just as excited as I was my very first time, which was many, many years ago. I love that part of the [W]orld and I especially love the fans. We always have such a good time and I've put together a lot of things for this show that I think the fans will love. We had not planned to come back so soon, but we got so much fan mail and such a great reaction that I thought, 'Well, why not. If they’re having a good time and we always do, let's just do it'".

The scheduling of the shows also sparked rumors the singer would perform at the Glastonbury Festival. Parton's participation in the festival was confirmed on June 1, 2014. She expressed her excitement, stating she's wanted to perform at the festival for many years. Before she hit the stage, she was honored by the RIAA with a plaque commemorating 100 million albums sold worldwide. The performance was a success, with BBC News reporting Parton drew the biggest crowd of the festival. Despite bad weather and mud, she performed at the Pyramid Stage in an all white catsuit. She performed an abbreviated setlist from the current runs; which featured a guest appearance by famed guitarist Richie Sambora on "Lay Your Hands On Me".

Despite the high praise, the festival appearance was shadowed by allegations of lip-synching. Sky News reporter, Kay Burley, tweeted her in disappointment with Parton for miming a huge event. This created an uproar on the Internet. Dolly responded to the chaos stating she was not miming. She continued to say "My boobs are fake, my hair's fake but what is real is my voice and my heart".

The news came alongside media reports of Parton in a car accident. Parton described the incident as a fender-bender and that she sustained no injuries. While touring in Australia, the singer will also launch her program Imagination Library in that region. In November 2013, show in California, Nevada and Arizona were revealed. Initially believed to be one-off shows, Parton stated the shows will kick off the 2014 tour. She further stated: "It's always great to perform at home in the good ol' U.S.A. We’re kicking off our Blue Smoke World Tour right here at home. I love traveling all over the world; but it's true, there's nothing like home". It was also reported additional shows in the U.S. (and possibly Canada) will take place in May 2014.

Set list
The following songs were performed during the January 28, 2014 concert at the Comerica Theatre in Phoenix, Arizona. It does not represent all concerts during the tour.

"Baby I'm Burnin'" / "Girl On Fire
"Why'd You Come in Here Lookin' Like That" 
"Jolene" 
"Blue Smoke" 
"Don't Think Twice" 
"My Tennessee Mountain Home" 
"(Give Me That) Old-Time Religion" / "I'll Fly Away" / "I’m on My Way to Canaan's Land"
"Coat of Many Colors" 
"Smoky Mountain Memories" 
"Rocky Top" 
"Together You and I" 
"Lay Your Hands on Me" 
"Two Doors Down" 
"Better Get to Livin'" 
"Lover du Jour" 
"Banks of the Ohio" 
"Little Sparrow"
"Travelin' Prayer" 
"Shine"
"It's All Wrong, But It's All Right" / "The Bargain Store" 
"Love Is Like a Butterfly" 
"Old Flames Can't Hold a Candle to You"
"But You Know I Love You" 
"Real Love" / "Think About Love"
"Here You Come Again" 
"Islands in the Stream" 
"9 to 5" 
Encore
"I Will Always Love You"

Tour dates

Box office score data

Notes

References

External links
Parton's Official Website

2014 concert tours
Dolly Parton concert tours